Changchun Rail Transit, is the rapid transit and light rail system in the city of Changchun, Jilin Province, China. Its first line, Line 3, is the first true light rail line in Mainland China. The system consists of three light rail lines and two rapid transit lines.

Construction of the first heavy-rail metro line, Line 1, started in 2011, and opened for service on 30 June 2017. Construction on the second heavy-rail metro line, Line 2, started in 2012 and opened for service on 30 August 2018.

Network

Line 1

Line 1 is the first heavy metro line Changchun, running in the north south axis of Changchun. Line 1's color is red.

Line 2

Line 2 is the second metro line in Changchun, running in the east west axis of Changchun. Line 2's color is blue.

Line 3

Line 3 was the first rail line to open. It is a light rail line in a S shape through Changchun, using low-floor light rail vehicles instead of the typical rapid transit cars. Unlike later lines, the line is not fully grade separated, having four level crossings. Line 3's color is green.

Line 4

Line 4 is another light rail line. Unlike line 3, it has complete grade separation, but still uses low-floor light rail vehicles, similar to the Seville Metro in Spain. It runs north south mostly on elevated viaducts with an underground section in the north. Line 4's color is purple.

Line 8

Line 8 is another light rail line. Like line 4, it is fully grade separated, but unlike line 4 is fully elevated instead of running partially underground, running entirely on viaducts. Line 8's color is teal.

Opening timeline
 30 October 2002:  Changchun Railway Station - Weiguang Street
 26 December 2006:  Weiguang Street - Changchun Movie Wonderland
 30 June 2011:  Dongdaqiao Bridge - Tiangong Road
 7 May 2012:  Changchun Railway Station (North) - Dongdaqiao Bridge
 30 June 2017:  North Ring Road - Hongzuizi
 30 August 2018:  Shuangfeng - Dongfang Square
 30 October 2018:  North Ring Road - Guangtong Road
 8 October 2021:  Shuangfeng - Qiche Gongyuan
 31 December 2021:  Changchun Railway Station - Puppet Regime Palace Museum

Future Development
The Phase 3 (2019-2024) expansion of Changchun Rail Transit was approved by the NDRC on November 30, 2018. According to the plan, Changchun Rail Transit will be  in length in 2024.

Under Construction
April 2022:  (Southern extension):  with 5 stations. Tiangong Road – Hejiatun. Light rail.
 June 2024: :  with 22 stations. Heavy rail.
 2025:  (Eastern extension):  with 6 stations.
 April 2025:  (Phase 1):  with 19 stations. Changchun International Automobile Park – East Ring Road. Heavy rail.
 June 2025:  (Airport line):  ( underground,  elevated) with 8 stations. Zhaojiagang East – Jiutai South railway station. Heavy rail.
2027:  (Phase 1):  with 18 stations. Southwestern Hub – Dongdaqiao Bridge. Heavy rail.

Planned
  (Southern extension):  with 2 stations. Changchun Movie Wonderland – Changchun No.59 Middle School. Light rail.

See also

Changchun
Changchun Tram
List of metro systems

References

External links
Changchun Railway Traffic Group
UrbanRail Page on Changchun Rail Transit

Changchun Rail Transit
Transport in Changchun
2002 establishments in China
Railway lines opened in 2002
750 V DC railway electrification
1500 V DC railway electrification